The longnose eagle ray or snouted eagle ray (Myliobatis longirostris) is a species of fish in the family Myliobatidae. This species was first described in 1964 by the American ichthyologist Shelton Pleasants Applegate, who was an expert on fossil and living sharks, and by American marine biologist John Edgar Fitch.

Distribution and habitat
The longnose eagle ray is native to tropical and warm temperate waters in the east central Pacific Ocean. Its ranges from Mexico to Peru.

Biology
Very little is known about this fish, its behaviour and ecology. Like other members of the genus they are ovoviviparous, the young developing in the uterus and receiving nourishment from a yolk or uterine secretions.

Status
Living in shallow water above the continental shelf and being a schooling fish, the longnose eagle ray is vulnerable to fishing activities; it is not a target species but is sometimes landed as bycatch by trawling, gillnets and longline fisheries, with the areas where it lives being subject to intensive fishing pressure. Off the coast of Mexico it is often caught while trawling for shrimps; most of the fish caught in this way are discarded, but some are sold locally as fresh meat, or the flesh is dried or salted. Because of this vulnerability to fishing, and because these eagle rays have a low fecundity, the International Union for Conservation of Nature has assessed their conservation status as being "vulnerable".

References

Myliobatis
Fish of Guatemala
Taxonomy articles created by Polbot
Fish described in 1964